The Beitou Plum Garden is a museum in the former residence of calligrapher Yu Youren in Beitou District, Taipei, Taiwan.

History
The building was constructed in the late 1930s as the summer getaway home of calligrapher Yu Youren. In 2006, the building was listed as a historical site by the Taipei City Government and was opened to the public in 2010. In 2015, the building was closed for renovation from January until 27 June.

Architecture
The wooden building was constructed using a mixture of Japanese and Western architectural styles with two floors. The ground floor was constructed as an air raid shelter which is heavily shielded with steel rods and reinforced concrete. Most of the floors uses deep polished wooden boards.

Exhibitions
The building houses various calligraphy works done by Yu Youren and history of local architecture. It also regularly host various musical events.

Transportation
The building is accessible within walking distance east of Xinbeitou Station of Taipei Metro.

See also
 List of tourist attractions in Taiwan

References

2010 establishments in Taiwan
Houses in Taiwan
Tourist attractions in Taipei